Integrin alpha-3 is a protein that in humans is encoded by the ITGA3 gene.
ITGA3 is an integrin alpha subunit. Together with beta-1 subunit, it makes up half of the α3β1 integrin duplex that plays a role in neural migration and corticogenesis, acted upon by such factors as netrin-1 and reelin.

ITGA3 encodes the integrin alpha 3 chain. Integrins are heterodimeric integral membrane proteins composed of an alpha chain and a beta chain. Alpha chain 3 undergoes post-translational cleavage in the extracellular domain to yield disulfide-linked light and heavy chains that join with beta 1 to form an integrin that interacts with many extracellular matrix proteins.

Alternative names 

The alpha 3 beta 1 integrin is known variously as: very late (activation) antigen 3 ('VLA-3'), very common antigen 2 ('VCA-2'), extracellular matrix receptor 1 ('ECMR1'), and galactoprotein b3 ('GAPB3').

Interactions 

CD49c has been shown to interact with:
 CD9 
 FHL2,
 LGALS8,  and
 TSPAN4.

References

Further reading

External links 
 
ITGA3 Info with links in the Cell Migration Gateway 
 

Integrins
Clusters of differentiation